Straubing-Bogen is a Landkreis (district) in the eastern part of Bavaria, Germany. Neighboring districts are (from the north clockwise) Cham, Regen, Deggendorf, Dingolfing-Landau, Landshut and Regensburg. The independent town of Straubing is surrounded by the district. The seat of the government of the district (Landratsamt) is located in Straubing.

The only towns within the district itself are Bogen and Geiselhöring.

Geography
The main river is the Danube, which crosses the district from the west to the east.  There are two major geographical regions in the district. One is the Gäuboden with the Danube region and lowlands, the other are the mountains of the Bavarian Forest (Bayerische Wald).

History
The district was created in 1972 by merging the previous districts Straubing and Bogen and parts of the district Mallersdorf.

Coat of arms
The coat of arms is based on the coat of arms of the former district Straubing. In the bottom are the white-and-blue diamonds as the symbol of Bavaria, as the Wittelsbach inherited them as their coat of arms upon the extinction of the Counts of Bogen. Above them the wavy line symbolizes the river Danube. The grain ears in the top part stand of the mostly agricultural structure of the district. The Madonna in the middle was added after the merger with the district Bogen, and stands for the St. Mary pilgrimate in Bogenberg.

Towns and municipalities

Former municipalities until 1 May 1978

References

External links

  (German)

 
Districts of Bavaria